Mia King (born 6 April 2001) is an Australian rules footballer who plays for North Melbourne in the AFL Women's (AFLW). It was revealed she signed on with the club for two more seasons on 17 June 2021, tying her to the club until the end of 2023.

References

External links

 

Living people
2001 births
North Melbourne Football Club (AFLW) players
Australian rules footballers from Tasmania
Sportswomen from Tasmania
Indigenous Australian players of Australian rules football